is a Japanese tennis player.

Uesugi has a career high ATP singles ranking of 650 achieved on 27 August 2018. He also has a career high ATP doubles ranking of 306 achieved on 20 June 2022.

Uesugi made his ATP main draw debut at the 2018 Rakuten Japan Open Tennis Championships in the doubles draw partnering Yoshihito Nishioka.

Future and Challenger finals

Singles: 1 (0–1)

Doubles 20 (10–10)

References

External links

1995 births
Living people
People from Sakai, Osaka
Japanese male tennis players
Sportspeople from Osaka Prefecture
Tennis players at the 2018 Asian Games
Asian Games medalists in tennis
Medalists at the 2018 Asian Games
Asian Games bronze medalists for Japan
Universiade medalists in tennis
Universiade gold medalists for Japan
Universiade silver medalists for Japan
Universiade bronze medalists for Japan
Medalists at the 2015 Summer Universiade
Medalists at the 2017 Summer Universiade
20th-century Japanese people
21st-century Japanese people